When Claude Got Shot is an 2021 American documentary film, directed and produced by Brad Lichtenstein. Snoop Dogg serves as an executive producer under his Snoopadelic Pictures banner. The film follows Claude Motley, who returns to his hometown for a high school reunion only to be a victim of gun violence.

The film had its world premiere at South by Southwest on March 17, 2021.

Synopsis
The film follows Claude Motley, who returns to his hometown for a high school reunion, only to be a victim of gun violence. Two days later, his assailant goes after a woman, Victoria Davison, who shoots him during the struggle, and feels guilty upon the discovery the assailant is paralyzed from the waist down. In a single weekend, three families’ lives are changed by gun violence.

Release
The film had its world premiere at South by Southwest on March 17, 2021.

References

External links
 

2021 films
2021 documentary films
American documentary films
Biographical documentary films
Documentary films about African Americans
Primetime Emmy Award-winning broadcasts
2020s English-language films
2020s American films
Works about gun politics in the United States